Carl Robert Belew (April 21, 1931 – October 31, 1990) was an American country music singer and songwriter. Belew recorded for Decca, RCA Victor, and MCA in the 1950s through 1970s, charting 11 times on Hot Country Songs. He also wrote singles for Johnnie & Jack, Eddy Arnold, Jim Reeves, and others.

Career
Born in Salina, Oklahoma, Belew's musical career began in the 1950s when he performed on the Louisiana Hayride. He signed to Decca Records by the end of the decade, reaching number 9 on the country music charts with "Am I That Easy to Forget", which was later recorded by Skeeter Davis, Debbie Reynolds, Esther Phillips, Engelbert Humperdinck, Jim Reeves, and others. Also in this period, Johnnie & Jack recorded Belew's "Stop the World and Let Me Off", while Andy Williams recorded "Lonely Street".

Belew's only other chart entry for Decca was the Number 19 "Too Much to Lose", followed by the Number 8 "Hello Out There", his first RCA Victor release, in 1962. He continued to write songs for others, including "What's He Doing in My World" by Eddy Arnold and "That's When I See the Blues" by Jim Reeves; both Waylon Jennings and Susan Raye charted in the 1970s with covers of "Stop the World and Let Me Off".

Belew died of cancer on October 31, 1990, in Salina, Oklahoma.

Discography

Albums
Carl Belew (1960)
Hello Out There (1964)
Am I That Easy to Forget (1965)
Another Lonely Night (1965)
Country Songs (1966)
Lonely Street (1967)
Twelve Shades of Belew (1968)
When My Baby Sings His Song (1972)

Singles

APeaked at 20 on Bubbling Under Hot 100 Singles.

References

1931 births
1990 deaths
American male singer-songwriters
American country singer-songwriters
Deaths from cancer in Oklahoma
Decca Records artists
People from Salina, Oklahoma
RCA Records artists
20th-century American singers
Country musicians from Oklahoma
20th-century American male singers
Singer-songwriters from Oklahoma